Johann Agricola may refer to:

Johann Friedrich Agricola (1720–1774), German composer
Johann Agricola (theologian) (1492–1566), German protestant Reformer, friend of Martin Luther